Andrew Boyce (born 5 November 1989) is an English footballer who plays as a defender for National League side Scunthorpe United.

Having come through the youth academy at Doncaster Rovers, Boyce has played professionally for Lincoln City, Scunthorpe United, Notts County, Hartlepool United and Grimsby Town and semi-professionally for Gainsborough Trinity, Worksop Town, King's Lynn and  Eastleigh.

Club career

Early career
Boyce began his career as a trainee at the age of 16 with Doncaster Rovers Academy and was offered his first pro contract with Rovers in the summer of 2008. He spent most of the 2008–09 season on loan at Worksop Town. Competition for places at Doncaster Rovers was intense with the team competing in the Championship, which culminated in Boyce being released by Rovers in January 2009. He then went for a trial with Mansfield Town in April 2009, but due to financial constraints he wasn't offered a contract. Boyce dropped into non-league football with Northern Premier League side King's Lynn, where he went on to make 18 league appearances for the club. He left King's Lynn in December 2009, the football club folding due to financial difficulties. Within a few days, he signed for Gainsborough Trinity. He helped Trinity reach the Conference North play-off final in the 2011–12 season.

Lincoln City
He earned a move to League Two side Lincoln City in May 2012. Due to both clubs being unable to agree a fee, later in the year a tribunal set a five-figure undisclosed fee, plus sell-on clause for the youngester's services. On 31 August 2013, he scored his first goal for the club, in the 2–1 away victory over Dartford; after his initial header was saved, the ball rebounded back to Boyce who then struck a right footed shot into the back of the net from 12 yards.

Scunthorpe United
After playing 60 matches for the Imps in the Conference Premier Boyce moved on loan to Scunthorpe United on 15 November 2013. He made his Football League debut on 26 December 2013 in a 2–0 win over Morecambe. He moved permanently to Scunthorpe on 6 January 2014, penning an 18-month contract. Having played a part in Scunthorpes successful promotion bid to League One. On 10 March 2014, he joined Conference Premier side Grimsby Town on loan for the remainder of the 2013–14 season. Boyce made 13 appearances for Grimsby and participated in the 2013–14 play-off legs.

On 3 August 2014 Boyce returned to Grimsby, joining on an initial one-month loan for the start of the 2014–15 season. After three clean sheets out of the first five games, although Grimsby wanted a longer deal, Boyces loan was extended for a further month. An injury crisis to a number of first team players lead to Boyce being recalled to Scunthorpe only a week later. Upon his return to Scunthorpe in September, he opened the scoring in the 3–2 away defeat at Oldham; a header from the centre of the box to the top right corner, from a Gary McSheffrey corner.

On 20 August 2015, Boyce joined League Two side Hartlepool United on a month-long loan deal. After playing six games for Hartlepool, his loan was extended for another month with the club. On 10 March 2016 Boyce signed on loan for Notts County until the end of the current season. He was released after his contract had expired at the end of the season.

Grimsby Town
On 21 June 2016, Boyce signed a two-year contract with newly promoted League Two side Grimsby Town on a free transfer. He scored his first goal for Grimsby in a 2–1 loss at Wycombe Wanderers on 13 August 2016.

Eastleigh
On 17 July 2017, Boyce signed for National League side Eastleigh on a free transfer.

Boyce was released at the end of the 2021–22 season, he had made 196 appearances in the League during his time on the south coast.

Return to Scunthorpe
Boyce re-signed for Scunthorpe United on 8 June 2022, following the club's relegation from the Football League.

Career statistics

Honours

Club
Scunthorpe United
League Two runner-up, second-place promotion: 2013−14

Club
Eastleigh FC
2021/22 Player Of The Season

References

External links

1989 births
Living people
Footballers from Doncaster
English footballers
Association football defenders
Doncaster Rovers F.C. players
Worksop Town F.C. players
King's Lynn F.C. players
Gainsborough Trinity F.C. players
Lincoln City F.C. players
Scunthorpe United F.C. players
Hartlepool United F.C. players
Notts County F.C. players
Grimsby Town F.C. players
English Football League players
National League (English football) players
Eastleigh F.C. players
Outfield association footballers who played in goal